Gutierritos is a Mexican telenovela produced by Valentín Pimstein for Telesistema Mexicano in 1966. It is a remake of the 1958 Mexican telenovela Gutierritos.

Cast 
Rafael Banquells as Angel Gutierrez 
María Rivas as Rosa Hernández
Mauricio Garcés as Jorge Contreras
Gerardo del Castillo as Mr. Martínez
Josefina Escobedo as Rosa's aunt
Patricia Morán as Elena
Manuel Lozano as Medina
Vicky Aguirre as Lupita
Dina de Marco as Anita
Carlos Navarro as Juan Ortega
Elvira Quintana as Mrs. Gutierrez
Miguel Suarez as Mr. Fernandez-Yanez
Carmen Cortes as Sirvienta

Other versions 
Gutierritos o drama dos humildes (Brazil version)
Un original y veinte copias (1978)

References

External links 

Mexican telenovelas
1966 telenovelas
Televisa telenovelas
Spanish-language telenovelas
1966 Mexican television series debuts
1966 Mexican television series endings